Silence in Paradise is a 2011 Colombian drama film directed by Colbert Garcia.

Cast
 Linda Baldrich as Lady
 Francisco Bolívar as Ronald

References

External links
 

2011 films
2011 drama films
2010s Spanish-language films
Colombian drama films
2010s Colombian films